H. Sridhar (Sridhar Hariharan/H.Padmanabh) was an Indian sound engineer known for his work with the Indian musician A. R. Rahman.

Sridhar was the Chief Audio Engineer at Media Artists Chennai. A mathematics graduate, with keen interest in electronics and formal music training, he started a professional sound engineering career in 1988. He had engineered over 200 films and worked closely with directors like Mani Ratnam, K Balachandar, Bharathiraaja, Shankar, Kamal Hassan, P C Sreeram, Priyadarsan, Sibi Malayil and Ramgopal Varma.

Among Sridhar's many professional credits was the fact that he engineered all songs and background scores for the renowned music director A. R. Rahman. Some ground-breaking films to his credit are Roja, Gentleman, Kadhalan, Thiruda Thiruda, Bombay, Duet, Mahanadi, Rangeela, Kuruthippunnal, Muthu, Indian, Minsaara Kanavu and Iruvar. He also engineered the background music score and songs for the national award-winning film Kalapani for music director Ilaiyaraaja and Minasaara Kanavu for music director A. R. Rahman.

Having pioneered the use of Digital Sound for Indian films in the DTS format, Sridhar successfully completed six-track surround sound mixing for more than 200 films including Karuppu Roja, Siraichaalai, Indian, Bharatheeyudu, Hindustani, Paeyi, Iruvar, Minsaara Kanavu, Sapnay, Ziddi, Judwaa, My Dear Kuttichathan 3D, V I P, Aflatoon, Devathai, Chhota Chetan, Pyar Kiya To Darna Kya, Satya, Jeans, Dil Se.., Kadhalar Dinam, Padayappa, Mudhalvan, Pukaar, Alaipaayuthey, Kandukondain Kandukondai, Kushi, among others.

Sridhar also engineered and mixed albums for international artists like George Harrison of The Beatles, John Neptune Kaizan, Pandit Ravi Shankar, Zakir Hussain, L.Shankar and John McLaughlin  (Mahavishnu Orchestra & Shakti fame).

He died in the morning of 1 December 2008 due to cardiac problems.

Awards 
Grammy Awards
Grammy Award for Best Compilation Soundtrack Album for a Motion Picture, Television or Other Visual Media – 'Jai Ho' – Slumdog Millionaire (2010)

National Film Awards
 National Film Award for Best Audiography – Mahanadi (1994)
 National Film Award for Best Audiography – Dil Se.. (1999)
 National Film Award for Best Audiography – Lagaan (2002)
 National Film Award for Best Audiography – Kannathil Muthamittal (2003)

Tamil Nadu State Film Awards
Tamil Nadu State Film Award for Best Audiographer – Karuppu Roja (1996)

Mirchi Music Awards
 Best Song Mixing & Engineering – "Dilli-6" from Delhi-6 (2009)

V. Shantaram Awards
 Best Sound award – Dasavathaaram (2009)

Recordings 
 Slumdog Millionaire (2009) (Sound Engineer)
 Connections (2009) (Sound Design & Final Mix)
 Ghajini (2008) (Sound Design and Music Mixing Engineer)
 Dasavathaaram (2008) (Sound Design & Final Mix)
 Jodhaa Akbar (2008) (Music Mix & Song Mix)
 Cheeni Kum (2007) (Sound Design & Final Mix)
 Bombil and Beatrice (2007) ( Audiography & ReRecording Mixer)
 Sivaji (2007) (Mixing Engineer)
 Guru (2007) (Audiography)
 Dharam (2007) ( Mixing Engineer)
 Provoked (2006) (sound re-recording mixer)
 Godfather (2006) (sound engineer)
 Water (2005) (additional music editing) (sound engineer)
 Ramji Londonwale (2005) (audiographer)
 Ah Aah: Anbe Aaruyire (2005) (sound mixer)
 Mangal Pandey: The Rising (2005) (music programming) (sound engineer)
 Swades (2004) (sound engineer) [fr]
 Aayutha Ezhuthu (2004) (sound engineer)
 Meenaxi: A Tale of Three Cities (2004) (sound designer)
 New (2004) (sound mixer)
 Boys (2003) (sound)
 Saathiya (2002) (sound designer)
 Om Jai Jagadish (2002) (sound re-recordist: Media Artists)
 Hum Kisi Se Kum Nahin (2002) (re-recording and song mixing)
 Kannathil Muthamittal (2002) (sound mixer) (DTS mix)
 Nayak: The Real Hero (2001) (sound recordist)
 Dil Chahta Hai (2001) (final mixing)
 Lagaan (2001) (final mixing engineer) (song recording)
 Tera Jadoo Chal Gayaa (2000) (sound re-recordist: Media Artist, Chennai)
 Pukar (2000) (sound re-recordist: Media Artist, Chennai)
 Alaipayuthey (2000) (dts mix)
 Thakshak (1999) (sound mixer)
 Mast (1999) (audiography)
 Vaastav: The Reality (1999) (re-recording and mixing: Media Artist)
 Sooryavansham (1999) (audiography: Media Artists)
 Kaun (1999) (sound designer)
 Bade Miyan Chote Miyan (1998) (re-recordist: Media Artist)
 Dil Se.. (1998) (audiography) (song recordist: Panchathan Records Inn) (sound mixer: Panchathan Records Inn) # Satya (1998) (sound designer)
 Kabhi Na Kabhi (1998) (song recordist: Panchathan Recording Inn, Madras) (as Sridhar) (sound re-recordist: Panchathan Recording Inn, Madras)
 Aflatoon (1997) (sound re-recordist: Media Artists, Chennai)
 Daud: Fun on the Run (1997) (music mixer)
 Jeet (1996) (background music recordist)
 Bombay (1995) (song recordist) (sound re-recordist)
 Rangeela (1995) (music mixer: Media Artistes) (sound effects: Media Artistes)

See also 
 A. R. Rahman – Ace Music director
 Panchathan Record Inn and AM Studios – Rahman's own recording studio

References

External links 
 
  H Sridhar Interview
 Media Artists H.Sridhar affiliation 
 
 H. Sridhar is no more.

Indian sound designers
Year of birth missing
2008 deaths
Film musicians from Kerala
20th-century Indian musicians
21st-century Indian musicians
Best Audiography National Film Award winners